Ovando is a census-designated place (CDP) in Powell County, Montana, United States. It is approximately fifty-four miles ENE of Missoula, Montana. The population was 71 at the 2000 census.

Ovando Hoyt was postmaster from 1883 to 1898. The Bob Marshall and Scapegoat wilderness areas are nearby.

Geography 
Ovando is located at  (47.015159, -113.141253).

Climate
This climatic region is typified by large seasonal temperature differences, with warm to hot (and often humid) summers and cold (sometimes severely cold) winters.  According to the Köppen Climate Classification system, Ovando has a humid continental climate, abbreviated "Dfb" on climate maps.

Demographics 

As of the census of 2000, there were 71 people, 33 households, and 22 families residing in the CDP. The population density was 7.9 people per square mile (3.0/km). There were 44 housing units at an average density of 4.9 per square mile (1.9/km). The racial makeup of the CDP was 97.18% White, and 2.82% from two or more races.

There were 33 households, out of which 27.3% had children under the age of 18 living with them, 54.5% were married couples living together, 9.1% had a female householder with no husband present, and 33.3% were non-families. 33.3% of all households were made up of individuals, and 15.2% had someone living alone who was 65 years of age or older. The average household size was 2.15 and the average family size was 2.68.

In the CDP, the population was spread out, with 21.1% under the age of 18, 29.6% from 25 to 44, 32.4% from 45 to 64, and 16.9% who were 65 years of age or older. The median age was 44 years. For every 100females there were 97.2 males. For every 100 females age 18 and over, there were 86.7 males.

The median income for a household in the CDP was $26,250, and the median income for a family was $31,250. Males had a median income of $21,250 versus $20,000 for females. The per capita income for the CDP was $15,012. There were 8.3% of families and 21.2% of the population living below the poverty line, including 26.7% of under eighteens and 33.3% of those over 64.

References 

Census-designated places in Powell County, Montana
Census-designated places in Montana